Willem II may refer to:

People
William II, Prince of Orange (1626–1650), stadtholder of the United Provinces of the Netherlands
William II of the Netherlands (1792–1849), King of the Netherlands

Other uses
Willem II (football club), a Dutch football club
Willem II (women), the women's division of the above club, active 2007–2011
Willem II–Gazelle, a professional cycling team active between 1966 and 1970
A Dutch brand of cigars

See also
 Wilhelm II (disambiguation)
 William II (disambiguation)